K.I.D.S. (backronym for Kickin' Incredibly Dope Shit) is the fourth mixtape by American rapper Mac Miller. It was released by Rostrum Records on August 13, 2010, through DatPiff. The title is a reference to the 1995 drama film Kids, which is quoted throughout the mixtape. It was later commercially released on April 29, 2020. A deluxe version was released on its 10th anniversary and includes two new tracks.

Content and release
Seven songs from K.I.D.S. had music videos created for them: "Nikes On My Feet", "Kool Aid & Frozen Pizza", "Knock Knock", "Senior Skip Day", "La La La La", "Traffic In The Sky", and "Don't Mind If I Do". The videos for "Nikes on My Feet" and "Kool Aid & Frozen Pizza" were both heavily played on YouTube, reaching over 50 million views each. Both songs featured prominent classic hip-hop samples, from Q-Tip's remix of Nas' "The World Is Yours" and Lord Finesse's "Hip 2 Da Game", respectively. In July 2012, Finesse filed a $10 million lawsuit against Miller, Rostrum and DatPiff for use of the sample. The lawsuit was settled out of court in December 2012, with its stipulations kept confidential.

To support the mixtape, Miller embarked on his first tour in early 2011, the "Incredibly Dope Tour".   Miller sold out at every location on the tour.

Rapper Logic credits the song "Kool Aid & Frozen Pizza" as an inspiration to create his debut mixtape.

Track listing 

Notes
 "Traffic in the Sky" and "La La La La" are omitted from many commercial releases on streaming services and vinyl due to Miller’s team being unable to clear their samples.

Charts

References

2010 mixtape albums
Mac Miller albums
Sampling controversies